The Association of Amalgamated Territorial Communities (AACT) is an organization of municipal government representing over 490 Ukrainian amalgamated  municipalities. Its stated purpose is to provide political and strategic leadership to represent the interests of local municipalities established in the process of voluntary association of territorial communities after Euromaidan. The AACT was founded in 2016.

External links 
 official website

See also 
 Official website

References 

Decentralization
Local government in Ukraine
Local government organizations
Hromadas of Ukraine